Julia Hobsbawm OBE (born 15 August 1964) is a British writer and public speaker.

Early life 
She is the daughter of historian Eric Hobsbawm and music teacher Marlene Schwarz, and attended Camden School for Girls.

After leaving the Polytechnic of Central London (now the University of Westminster) without qualifications in the early 1980s, she worked as a researcher in television, before moving to political fundraising for the Labour Party before the 1992 General Election.

Career
She has held Honorary Visiting Professorships at the University of the Arts, London, and more recently at Bayes Business School (formerly Cass Business School), including a role as Honorary Visiting Professor in Workplace Social Health until 2020. Since September 2022 she writes the "Working Assumptions" column for Bloomberg News' section on work, Work Shift, having formerly been an editor-at-large for wellbeing portal Thrive, and a columnist for Strategy+Business magazine.

She began hosting The Nowhere Office podcast with Stefan Stern in March 2021.

Hobsbawm was appointed an OBE in the Queen's Birthday Honours list in 2015 for services to business.

She is a patron of the Facial Surgery Research Foundation and the Zoe Sarojini Trust, a charity educating girls in South Africa and was a founding trustee in the UK of OurBrainBank.

Books 
 The Nowhere Office, Reinventing Work and the Workplace of the Future, Basic Books/John Murray (UK) and Public Affairs (US) (2022)
 The Simplicity Principle, Six Steps Towards Clarity in a Complex World, Kogan Page (2020)
 Fully Connected: Surviving and Thriving in an Age of Overload, Bloomsbury (2017)
 The See-Saw: 100 Ideas for Work-Life Balance, Atlantic Books (2009)
 Where the Truth Lies: Trust and Morality in the Business of PR, Journalism and Communications, Atlantic Books (2006)

References

External links
 www.juliahobsbawm.com 
 Julia Hobsbawm on Twitter
 David Benjamin and David Komlos, "Julia Hobsbawm On The Nowhere Office And This Fascinating Moment Of 'Great Re-Evaluation, Forbes, 25 July 2022.

1964 births
Place of birth missing (living people)
Living people
English Jewish writers
English people of Polish-Jewish descent
English women writers
Officers of the Order of the British Empire
People educated at Camden School for Girls